The Golconda School, located at Morrison and Fourth Sts. in Golconda, Nevada, is a historic building built in 1888.

It includes vernacular Second Empire style architectural elements.

National Register of Historic Places
The school was listed on the National Register of Historic Places in 1991.

It was deemed significant for association with the economic development of Golconda, for "documenting the history of education in Nevada", and "as an unusually well-preserved 19th century wood-frame vernacular school."

References

Schools in Nevada
Buildings and structures in Humboldt County, Nevada
Education in Humboldt County, Nevada
School buildings completed in 1888
School buildings on the National Register of Historic Places in Nevada
National Register of Historic Places in Humboldt County, Nevada
Second Empire architecture in Nevada